Salon Recreativo is the eleventh studio album of the Polish rock band Kult, released on October 1, 2001. The first edition of Salon Recreativo was released with the bonus CD.

Track listing
 all tracks by Kult (music) and Kazik Staszewski (lyrics) except where noted.

CD 1
 "Dla Twojej miłości" – 5:07 ("For Your Love")
 "Twójmój czas" – 3:46 ("Yourmy Time")
 "Brooklyńska Rada Żydów" – 5:35 ("The Jews' Council of Brooklyn")
 "Łączmy się w pary, kochajmy się" – 4:24 ("Let's Pair Up, Love Each Other")
 "Najbardziej chciany bandyta w Polsce" – 4:13 ("The Most Wanted Bandit in Poland")
 "Pełniej" – 3:41 ("More Fully")
 "Piotr Pielgrzym" – 5:23 ("Peter the Pilgrim")
 "Henryk Wujek" – 2:59 
 "Forum internetowe" – 4:37 ("Internet Forum")
 "With a Little Help from My Friends" (Lennon–McCartney) – 2:35
 "Dokąd uciekasz?" – 4:21 ("Where Are You Running to?")
 "Uwiąd starczy" – 5:04 ("Senile Decay")
 "Ogrodzenie" – 4:46 ("Hedge")
 "Sen Bruna S." – 5:03 ("The Dream of Bruno S.")
 "Ze mną się bracie nie napijesz?" – 5:25 ("Won't You Have a Drink With Me, Brother?")
 "Amulet" – 6:20 ("The Amulet")

CD 2 (bonus)
 "To nie jest wasz dom - nasz on!" – 4:05 ("This Isn't Your Home - It's Ours!")
 "Großßtanz" – 10:18 ("The Great Dance")
 "Konsument" – 4:01 ("The Consumer")
 "Radio Tirana" – 3:54 ("Radio Tirana")
 "Wódka" – 5:06 ("Vodka")
 "Artyści niezależni" – 3:10 ("Independent Artists")
 "Generał Ferreira" – 5:16 ("General Ferreira")
 "Złodzieje w Wejherowie" – 4:40 ("Thieves in Wejherowo")
 "Wanilia" – 3:21 ("Vanilla")
 "Amulet (Kazik's version)" – 6:10
 "Forum (Kazik's version)" – 4:41
 "Najbardziej chciany bandyta w Polsce (Kazik's version)" – 4:14
 "Salon Recreativo" – 4:25

Singles
 "Brooklińska Rada Żydów" (2001)
 "Łączmy się w pary, kochajmy się" (2001)

Kult (band) albums
2001 albums